Shacha may refer to the following rivers in Russia:

 Shacha (Kostroma Oblast), tributary of the Kostroma
 Shacha (Ryazan Oblast), tributary of the Tsna

See also 
 Shacha sauce